Walang Hanggang Paalam (International title:  Irreplaceable / ) is a 2020 Philippine romance drama television series broadcast by Kapamilya Channel. Directed by Emmanuel Q. Palo and Darnel Joy R. Villaflor, it stars Paulo Avelino, Zanjoe Marudo, Arci Muñoz, Angelica Panganiban and JC Santos. The series aired on the network's Primetime Bida evening block and worldwide via The Filipino Channel from September 28, 2020, to April 16, 2021, on Monday to Friday at 9:35 PM, replacing A Soldier's Heart, and was replaced by Init sa Magdamag.

Plot
Emerging from a terrible event that changes the course of his life, Emman finds a stable job and lives a simple life in the province of Alcala with his father and brother. Blessings continue to come Emman's way when he reunites with his son, Robbie, for the child's birthday celebration and finally buries the hatchet with his ex-wife Celine. However, Celine's fiancé Anton cannot help but burn with jealousy despite her continued reassurance. As their reunion nears its end, things take a turn for the worse when an unidentified man takes Robbie captive in broad daylight. The story of Emman's and Celine's loss is every parent's nightmare. To lose one's child is devastating, and to lose them to an organ trafficking syndicate preying on defenseless and innocent children is an abomination. The couple, once estranged, come together to search for their son, and discover their love for one another is still there. In the process, they discover the betrayal of people they trust, and the evil permeating within their community.

Cast and characters

Main cast
 Paulo Avelino as Emmanuel "Emman" Salvador
 Zanjoe Marudo as Antonio "Anton" Hernandez
 Arci Muñoz as Samantha "Sam" Agoncillo
 Angelica Panganiban as Celine Delgado

Supporting cast
 JC Santos as Carlos "Caloy" Rivera
 Cherry Pie Picache as Dr. Amelia Hernandez
 Tonton Gutierrez as Gen. Leonardo "Leo" Chavez
 Lotlot de Leon as Linda Delgado
 Ronnie Lazaro as Nicholas "Nick" Salvador
 Sherry Lara as Dr. Araceli "Cely" Hernandez
 McCoy de Leon as Bernardo "Bernie" Salvador
 Mary Joy Apostol as Analyn Legaspi
 Victor Silayan as Franco Vergara / Diego Villanueva
 Javi Benitez as Arnold Hernandez
 Marvin Yap as Marcelito "Marcelo" Marquez
 Arthur Acuña as Col. Gabriel "Gabo" Manzano
 Ana Abad Santos as Clarissa Chavez
 Robbie Wachtel as Roberto "Robbie" D. Salvador
 Yñigo Delen as Lester Hernandez / Lester H. Chavez
 Al Gatmaitan as Maj. Dante Francisco

Guest cast
 Jake Cuenca as Dexter Joaquin
 Jun Nayra as PCpt. Ferdinand Galang
 Joko Diaz as Nestor Elardo
 Jong Cuenco as Col. Homer Agoncillo

Production
The project was first unveiled on February 11, 2020 as Burado. Julia Montes, Nadine Lustre and Thai actor Denkhun Ngamnet were initially cast for the leading roles. Initial scenes were already shot in Thailand. In March 2020, production was halted due to the COVID-19 pandemic in the Philippines. In spite of the shutdown of ABS-CBN due to the expired franchise, production has reportedly been pushed through. On June 9, 2020, Julia Montes and Nadine Lustre backed out of the project. Arci Muñoz took over one of their roles, with Angelica Panganiban filling the gap a month later. On August 10, 2020, Dreamscape stated that Burado was cancelled due to pandemic restrictions, taking the toll on its production and Denkhun Ngamnet is unable to travel to the Philippines. Instead, the project was renamed to Walang Hanggang Paalam.

During the drama's media conference on September 25, 2020 via Zoom and YouTube, Angelica Panganiban announced that Walang Hanggang Paalam will be her "final project" and declares her retirement from television dramas.

Walang Hanggang Paalam was also taped on July 10, 2020, the day were the House of Representatives rejected the new franchise for ABS-CBN. The cast were emotional after hearing the news.

Broadcast
Walang Hanggang Paalam premiered on September 28, 2020 on cable and satellite via Kapamilya Channel, with simulcast on The Filipino Channel. In October 2020, the drama made its premiere on free-to-air television via A2Z Channel 11 and later, TV5 starting March 8, 2021.

Accolades

See also
List of programs broadcast by Kapamilya Channel
List of programs broadcast by A2Z (Philippine TV channel)
List of programs aired by TV5 (Philippine TV network)
List of programs broadcast by ABS-CBN
List of programs broadcast by Jeepney TV
List of ABS-CBN drama series

References

External links

ABS-CBN drama series
Philippine melodrama television series
Philippine romance television series
Philippine crime television series
Television series by Dreamscape Entertainment Television
2020 Philippine television series debuts
2021 Philippine television series endings
Philippine action television series
Filipino-language television shows
Television shows set in the Philippines
Murder in television